Kiri Vong District is a district located in Takeo Province, in southern Cambodia. According to the 1998 census of Cambodia, it had a population of 92,446.

Administration
As of 2019, Kiri Vong District has 12 communes, 115 villages.

References 

 
Districts of Takéo province